Amarjit Singh Dulat (born 1940)  was a spymaster and a former special director of the Indian Intelligence Bureau and former Secretary of Research and Analysis Wing from 1999 to 2000. After retirement, he was appointed as an advisor on Jammu and Kashmir in the Prime Minister's Office and served there from January 2000 to May 2004.

Career

Born in a Dulat Jat family in 1965, Dulat joined the Indian Police Service from Rajasthan Cadre and in March 1969, joined the Intelligence Bureau. He was educated at Bishop Cotton School, Shimla and graduated from Panjab University, Chandigarh.

Dulat served in Kashmir as Joint Director in the Intelligence Bureau from 1988 to 1990 which was arguably the most troublesome time in the valley. His interception into Kashmir politics in 1990 was through Shabir Shah, whom he termed as "big daddy of militants", having international links. Dulat then moved to Intelligence Bureau where he was promoted to the rank of Special Director. In 1999, he became chief of Research and Analysis Wing until his December 2000 retirement.

In 2015, he came to the center-stage of a lot of media speculation on account of his book Kashmir: The Vajpayee Years. In 2018, he co-authored The Spy Chronicles: RAW, ISI and the Illusion of Peace with Asad Durrani, former head of the Inter-Services Intelligence.

Bibliography
Kashmir: The Vajpayee Years (with Aditya Sinha) (HarperCollins, 2015) 
The Spy Chronicles: RAW, ISI and the Illusion of Peace (with Asad Durrani and Aditya Sinha) (HarperCollins, 2018) 
A Life In The Shadows: A Memoir (HarperCollins, 2022)

References

Indian Police Service officers
People of the Research and Analysis Wing
1940 births
Living people
Intelligence Bureau (India)
Indian spies
Indian political writers
21st-century Indian non-fiction writers
Panjab University alumni
Bishop Cotton School Shimla alumni